The GM High Feature engine (also known as the HFV6, and including the 3600 LY7 and derivative LP1) is a family of modern DOHC V6 engines produced by General Motors. The series was introduced in 2004 with the Cadillac CTS and the Holden Commodore (VZ).

It is a 60° 24-valve design with aluminum block and heads and sequential multi-port fuel injection. Most versions feature continuously variable cam phasing on both intake and exhaust valves and electronic throttle control. Other features include piston oil-jet capability, forged and fillet rolled crankshaft, sinter forged connecting rods, a variable-length intake manifold, twin knock control sensors and coil-on-plug ignition. It was developed by the same international team responsible for the Ecotec, including the Opel engineers responsible for the 54° V6, with involvement with design and development engineering from Ricardo plc.

GM's Austrailian auto division Holden produced a HFV6 engine under the name "Alloytec".

History 
The HFV6 was designed, tested and produced in a joint program by Holden and Cadillac. A majority of designs into the new alloy construction, transmission pairing and first use in production were all undertaken in Detroit (and manufactured in St. Catharines, Ontario). Holden had the job of developing smaller engines (Holden 3.2, LP1 and Saab 2.8, LP9 Turbo) as well as their own Holden 3.6 and 3.0 HFV6 (called the Alloytec V6) for local models.

Cadillac and Holden both tested variations of these engines in the United States and Australia.

2.8

LP1 
A  LP1 variant was introduced in the 2005 Cadillac CTS. It was also used on the Chinese 2008 CTS. It has a  bore and stroke, sequential multi-port fuel injection and a 10.0:1 compression ratio. The LP1 was built in St. Catharines, Ontario.

Applications:

LP9  

This engine is also known as a A28NET, Z28NET, Z28NEL or B284.

The LP9 is a 2.8 L turbocharged version used for the Saab 9-3, Saab 9-5 and other GM vehicles. It has the same bore and stroke as the naturally aspirated LP1, however the compression ratio is reduced to 9.5:1. The engine is manufactured at Holden's Fishermans Bend engine factory in Port Melbourne, Australia, while GM Powertrain Sweden (formerly Saab Automobile Powertrain) is responsible for turbocharging the engine. Global versions of this engine use the same horsepower rating for both metric and imperial markets – mechanical horsepower – while the Europe-only versions are rated in metric horsepower.

Applications:

LAU 
The LAU is GM's new code for the LP9 Turbo engine, its usage starting with the 2010 Cadillac SRX. In 2011, production of the Cadillac SRX with the LAU engine ceased, but the engine remained in use in the Saab 9-4X until 2012, when production of that model came to an end.

Applications:

3.0

LF1 
The LF1 is a  version with a bore and stroke of  produced between 2010 and 2014 equipped with spark ignition direct injection (SIDI) and a 11.7:1 compression ratio.

Applications:

LFW 
The LFW is a flexible fuel version of the LF1, capable of running on E85, gasoline, or any mixture of the two.  Output is identical to the LF1.

Applications:

3.2  

It has a 10.3:1 compression ratio. Holden also produced the 3.2 L engines that were used by Alfa Romeo as the basis of its JTS V6 engine.

Applications:
 2006-2010 Daewoo Winstorm / Chevrolet Captiva / Holden Captiva
 2006-2010 Opel Antara / Daewoo Winstorm MaXX / Holden Captiva MaXX
 2008-2012 Suzuki Grand Vitara

3.6

LY7 
The  LY7 engine was developed primarily by Holden and introduced in the 2004 Holden Commodore and 2004 Cadillac CTS sedan. Lower powered versions only have variable cam phasing on the inlet cam (LE0). Selected models also include variable exhaust. The engine weighs  as installed.

This engine is produced in several locations: St. Catharines (Ontario), Flint Engine South (Michigan), Melbourne (Australia), Ramos Arizpe (Mexico), and Sagara (Japan) by Suzuki.

Suzuki's engine designation is N36A.

The dual fuel  LW2 version was able to run on petrol and autogas. The LW2 engine was based on the low-output LE0 V6. It featured a factory-fitted dual fuel system developed by IMPCO, different valves and hardened titanium valve seats. This motor was available exclusively in Holden vehicles from 2005 - 2012.

Applications:

LLT 
The  LLT is a direct injected version based on the earlier LY7 engine. It was first unveiled in May 2006, and the DI version was claimed to have 15 percent greater power, 8 percent greater torque, and 3 percent better fuel economy than its port-injected counterpart. This engine debuted on the 2008 Cadillac STS and CTS. GM used a LLT in all 2009 Lambda-derived crossover SUVs to allow class-leading fuel economy in light of the new Corporate Average Fuel Economy (CAFE) standards.

Applications:

LFX 
The LFX is an enhanced version of the LLT engine developed jointly by Holden and Cadillac. Introduced in the MY2012 Holden Commodore SV6/Z and the MY2012 Chevrolet Camaro LS/LT, it is  lighter than the LLT, due to a redesigned cylinder head and integrated exhaust manifold, and composite intake manifold. Other components like the fuel injectors, intake valves, and fuel pump have also been updated. Power and torque are up slightly from the LLT. The compression ratio is 11.5:1. The LFX also features E85 flex-fuel capability.

Applications:

LWR 
The LWR is dedicated LPG 3.6-liter engine. Introduced in the MY2012 Holden Commodore, Based on the 3.6-litre LY7 engine, the LWR had a vapour injection system. The vapour injection system injected gas directly into the air intake runner, thereby preventing excess gas from circulating through the air intake system. Although liquid LPG injection generally produces more power, Holden justified vapour injection on the grounds of lower fuel consumption, lower  emissions, reduced pumping and parasitic losses, and start-up reliability in hot weather.

The LWR engine was mated to GM's six-speed 6L45 automatic transmission and, over the combined ADR 81/02 test cycle, the Commodore Omega achieved fuel consumption of  – an improvement of  compared to its dual fuel LW2 predecessor. Furthermore, the LWR engine exceeded Euro 6 emissions standards.
 Specially hardened valves and valve seats.
 A redesigned cylinder head and manifold for improved air flow.
 Variable exhaust valve timing (the LW2 engine only had variable intake valve timing)
 Specially-developed fuel injectors.
 New pistons with pentroof-style centre-domes and valve eyelets for a higher compression ratio of 12.2:1 (compared to 10.2:1 for the dual fuel engine).
 A new fuel rail and a new LPG fuel filter.
Applications:

LCS 
The  LCS is derived from the direct-injected LLT for use in hybrids, using the two-mode system. Differences from the LLT include a slightly lower compression ratio, 11.3:1, and lower power and torque peaks.
Fuel economy  in city,  on highway
Applications:
 2009 Saturn Vue Hybrid [product canceled]

LF3 
The 3.6 L twin-turbocharged version for the 2014 Cadillac CTS and 2014 Cadillac XTS was announced at the 2013 NYAS.

In essence, the twin-turbo 3.6L V6 is the forced-induction variant of the popular LFX V6 found in the Cadillac ATS, XTS, and SRX, among many other GM models, with several important upgrades, including:
 All-new cylinder block casting
 All-new cylinder head castings
 Strengthened connecting rods
 Forged steel crankshaft
 Continuously variable valve timing
 Large  intake valves and  sodium-filled exhaust valves
 Machined, domed aluminum pistons with top steel ring carrier for greater strength
 10.2:1 compression ratio
 Patented, integrated charge air cooler system with low-volume air ducts
 Twin-turbochargers produce more than 
 Vacuum-actuated wastegates with electronic control valves
 All-new direct injection fuel system
 Tuned air inlet and outlet resonators, aluminum cam covers and other features that contribute to exceptional quietness and smoothness

Applications:

LF4 
The LF4 is a higher-performance variant of the LF3 for use in the Cadillac ATS-V. Changes to the LF3 include:
 Turbochargers with low-inertia titanium-aluminide turbines and vacuum-actuated wastegates for more responsive torque production
 Compressors matched for peak efficiency at peak power levels, for optimal track performance
 Patent-pending low-volume charge-cooling system that optimizes packaging efficiency and maximizes boost pressure
 Lightweight titanium connecting rods that reduce inertia of the rotating assembly, complementing the quick-spooling turbochargers
 Higher-flow fuel injectors
 Oil pan baffling for better oil flow at high cornering speeds

Applications:

LFR
The LFR is a bi-fuel variant of the LFX, although multi-point fuel injection is used for both the gasoline and CNG instead of direct-injection.

Applications:

LFY
The LFY is similar to the LFX, but adds stop-start technology and has improved airflow.

Applications:

Fourth generation
Starting with 2016 Cadillac models a new generation of High Feature V6s were developed. They also incorporate engine start-stop technology, cylinder-deactivation, 2-stage oil pumps, and updated variable valve timing featuring intermediate park technology for late-intake valve closure. Both engines debuted in the 2016 Cadillac CT6.

3.0 L

LGW 
Maximum engine speed is 6500 RPM. Premium unleaded fuel is required.

Applications:

LGY 
Maximum engine speed is 6500 RPM. Premium unleaded fuel is required.

Applications:

3.6 L

LGX 
Intake and exhaust valves are also increased in size along with other changes to the cylinder head. Compression ratio is 11.5:1 and maximum engine speed is 7200 RPM.

Applications:

LGZ 
The LGZ is a variant of the LGX designed for pickup truck use.

Applications:

7.2L V12 
On March 21, 2007 AutoWeek reported that GM was planning to develop a 60-degree V12 based on this engine family to power the top version of Cadillac's upcoming flagship sedan. This Cadillac would essentially have had two 3.6 L High Feature V6s attached crankshaft-to-crankshaft and would have featured high-end technologies including direct injection and cylinder deactivation. Development of the engine was reportedly being conducted in Australia by Holden.

In August, 2008, GM announced that development of the V12 had been cancelled.

Timing chain issues
Mainly earlier production 2.8, 3.0, 3.2, and 3.6 liter engines with the three chain design suffered from premature timing chain failures due to a faulty PCV system and extended oil change intervals. Most of the problems occurred on pre LFX engines.

Holden High Feature engine

Holden sold a HFV6 engine under the name Alloytec. The High Feature moniker on the Holden produced engine is reserved for the twin cam phasing high output version. The block was designed to be expandable from 2.8 L to 4.0 L. High Feature V6 engines were previously produced in Fishermans Bend, Port Melbourne, Australia and remain in production at the following four manufacturing locations: St. Catharines Engine Plant, St. Catharines, Canada; Flint Engine South in Flint, Michigan, United States; Romulus Engine Plant in Romulus, MI and Ramos Arizpe, Coahuila, Mexico. The assembly lines for the St. Catharines and Flint facilities were manufactured by Hirata Corporation at their powertrain facility in Kumamoto, Japan. Most of the designs of this motor happened in Flint. They were first produced for the Cadillac range. The engine block and cylinder heads are cast at Defiance Foundry in Defiance, Ohio.

See also 
 List of GM engines
 GM High Value engine
 GM Ultra Engine

References

External links 

 Technical article from AutoSpeed
 GM Unveils New Direct Injection V-6 - Ward's Auto World
 WebWombat article
 http://www.gminsidenews.com/index.php?page=Engine_Guide
 http://www.chevrolet.com/impala-4-door-sedan.html
 https://web.archive.org/web/20140109174626/http://www.chevrolet.com/2013-traverse-crossover-suv.html

High Feature
V6 engines
Gasoline engines by model